Ditchfield is an English surname shared by:

Andy Ditchfield, founder of English rock band DeeExpus
Jimmy Ditchfield, 19th century football player for Burslem Port Vale F.C.
Right Rev. Dr. John Edwin Watts Ditchfield (1861–1923), first Church of England Bishop of Chelmsford
Rev. Dr. Peter Ditchfield (1854–1930), Church of England priest, local historian and editor of the Berkshire volumes of the Victoria County History